The Hung Shing Temple in Wan Chai, Hong Kong is one of the forty-two temples dedicated to Hung Shing in the Hong Kong.

Location
The temple is located at Nos. 129–131 Queen's Road East, Wan Chai. Tai Wong Street West and Tai Wong Street East intersect with Queen's Road East across the street from the temple. The two streets derive their name from the temple, as "Tai Wong" is an alternate name for Hung Shing. The temple was originally built next to the shoreline, facing the sea, but as the consequence of successive land reclamations, it is now surrounded by clusters of residential and commercial buildings.

History
The temple was probably built in 1847 and may have existed previously as a shrine. Renovations were recorded to have been carried out in 1857, 1860, 1867, 1949 and 1992. An annexe Kwun Yum temple was constructed to its left in 1867.

Features
The temple was built with boulders from the hillside and its right portion and back are sitting on rocks. It is a simple one-hall building with a granite platform right in front of its façade. The roof of the platform is supported by elaborate granite columns and accessing staircases are built on either ends rather than in the middle facing the temple entrance. The ceramic decorations of Shiwan kiln on the roof date from 1909. Together with Hung Shing, other deities worshiped there include Madame Kam Fa, Pau Kung and Shing Wong.

Conservation
The management of the Temple has been delegated to the Tung Wah Group of Hospitals by the Chinese Temples Committee since pre-war times. It has been listed as a Grade I historic building since 1987 and it is part of the Wan Chai Heritage Trail, established in 2009.

Festivals
Worshippers of Hung Shing go to pray in the temple on the 1st and the 15th day of every lunar month and on the birthday of Kwun Yum, the Goddess of Mercy.

References

External links
 

Grade I historic buildings in Hong Kong
Queen's Road East
Taoist temples in Hong Kong
Wan Chai
Religious buildings and structures completed in 1847